The Sierra alligator lizard or imbricate alligator lizard (Barisia ciliaris) is a species of medium-sized lizard in the family Anguidae. The species is endemic to Mexico.

References

Barisia
Reptiles of Mexico
Reptiles described in 1942
Taxa named by Hobart Muir Smith